The Sword with No Name is a 2009 South Korean film based on a fictionalized account of Empress Myeongseong. The film sold 1,671,387 tickets nationwide.

Plot
Mu-myeong is a bounty hunter during the Joseon Dynasty who lives day-to-day by catching fugitives. His life is forever changed when, on one of his missions, he meets a beautiful noblewoman, Min Ja-young, and falls in love with her. Several years pass and Ja-young enters the royal palace to be married to Emperor Gojong as the next queen of Joseon. Lovesick, Mu-myeong joins the royal guard to be near Ja-young, staying loyally by her side as she navigates court politics and rises to the throne to become the Empress Myeongseong.

Myeongseong tries to modernize the dynasty by breaking it off from its hermit kingdom past while avoiding being colonized by Russia and Japan. She becomes embroiled in a political power struggle with the court's conservative Confucian faction, led by her own father-in-law, the regent Daewongun. As threats against the queen grow, Mu-myeong tries to protect her by fending off assassination attempts from foreign and domestic enemies.

Cast
Cho Seung-woo as Mu-myeong (literally "Nameless") 
Soo Ae as Min Ja-young, later Empress Myeongseong
Chun Ho-jin as Daewongun, Gojong's father
Choi Jae-woong as Noe-jeon
Kim Young-min as Emperor Gojong
Park Min-hee as Mi Woo-ra
Go Soo-hee as So-hee
Song Hee-yeon as Dae-doo
Lee Yong-nyeo as Court lady Choi
Yoon Young-bae as Min Young-ik
Bong Man-dae as Lee Saeng-won/Ji Kyeong-chool
Lee Joo-sil as Ja-young's mother
Kim So-hee as Mu-myeong's mother 
Lee Joon-myeong as young Mu-myeong
Shin Cheol-jin as Go Jong's eunuch	
Yeo Moo-young as Prime Minister
Sophie Broustal as Isabel
 Jung Woon-sun as Ja Young's waiting lady
 Lee Moo-saeng as Noe-jeon's subordinate #2

Awards and nominations

References

External links
  
 
 
 

South Korean historical romance films
2009 films
Funimation
Films set in the Joseon dynasty
2000s historical romance films
Showbox films
2009 romantic drama films
South Korean romantic drama films
2000s South Korean films